Michael Haydn's Symphony No. 18 in C major, Perger 10, Sherman 18, MH 188, written in Salzburg in 1773, is the fifth of the C major symphonies attributed to Joseph Haydn in Hoboken's catalog.

Scored for 2 oboes, 2 English horns, 2 fifes, 3 bassoons, tamburo and strings, in four movements:

Allegro molto
Andante, in F major
Minuet and Trio
Vivace

The Minuet is unusual in that it has a composed coda (as opposed to a mere da capo repeat after the trio) something which would become standard in the Scherzi of Ludwig van Beethoven.

Discography

Included in a set of 20 symphonies on the CPO label with Bohdan Warchal conducting the Slovak Philharmonic, as well as an Olympia CD remastering of Ervin Acél's recording with the Oradea Philharmonic, which comes with Symphonies No.s 29 and 30. It has also been recorded by the Warsaw Sinfonietta conducted by Wojciech Czepiel. An LP was released in 1983 on EMI by the Bournemouth Sinfonietta conducted by Harold Farberman.

References

 A. Delarte, "A Quick Overview Of The Instrumental Music Of Michael Haydn" Bob's Poetry Magazine November 2006: 19 PDF
 Charles H. Sherman and T. Donley Thomas, Johann Michael Haydn (1737 - 1806), a chronological thematic catalogue of his works. Stuyvesant, New York: Pendragon Press (1993)
 C. Sherman, "Johann Michael Haydn" in The Symphony: Salzburg, Part 2 London: Garland Publishing (1982): lxviii

Symphony 18
Compositions in C major
1773 compositions